The Ren & Stimpy Show is an American animated series that includes two main voice actors, and numerous regular cast and recurring guest stars. The principal cast consists of John Kricfalusi (seasons 1–2) and Billy West, while Cheryl Chase, Harris Peet, Michael Pataki and others have appeared as supporting cast members. Guest cast members include Frank Zappa, Randy Quaid, Gilbert Gottfried, Rosie O'Donnell, Dom DeLuise, Phil Hartman, Mark Hamill, Alan Young, Frank Gorshin and Tommy Davidson.

Crew

References

Cast and crew members
1990s television-related lists
Lists of 20th-century people